The Cruelty to Animals Act 1835 was an Act of the Parliament of the United Kingdom (5 & 6 Will. 4, c. 59), intended to protect animals, and in particular cattle, from mistreatment. Its long title is An Act to Consolidate and Amend the Several Laws Relating to the Cruel and Improper Treatment of Animals, and the Mischiefs Arising from the Driving of Cattle, and to Make Other Provisions in Regard Thereto.

Passage 
The Act was introduced as a bill by the member of parliament for South Durham, Joseph Pease, who was a Quaker and a member of the committee of the Society for the Prevention of Cruelty to Animals. The law was passed in part due to lobbying by the Society (founded 1824, since 1840 the RSPCA). The Act was repealed and replaced by the Cruelty to Animals Act 1849 12 & 13 Vict. c. 92.

Animal baiting 

The British legal action to protect animals began with the passing of the Cruel Treatment of Cattle Act 1822 to Prevent Cruel and Improper Treatment of Cattle. The 1835 Act amended the existing legislation to prohibit the keeping of premises for the purpose of staging the baiting of bulls, dogs, bears, badgers or "other Animal (whether of domestic or wild Nature or Kind)", which facilitated further legislation to protect animals, create shelters, veterinary hospitals and more humane transportation and slaughter. The Act also banned (but failed to eradicate) dog fighting and cockfighting.

By the 18th century bear-baiting had largely died out in Britain, with the cost of importing bears for blood sports prohibitively high, but bull-baiting remained popular and dog fighting and cockfighting were common. At the time of the Act, the "bull stone" of Leslie, Fife was first recorded in the New Statistical Account of Scotland as an item which had already fallen out of use. It is a large stone to which bulls and occasionally bears were tied before being baited.

See also 
 Animal welfare in the United Kingdom

References

Further reading

External links
An Act to Consolidate and Amend the Several Laws Relating to the Cruel and Improper Treatment of Animals, and the Mischiefs Arising from the Driving of Cattle, and to Make Other Provisions in Regard Thereto
“Rational Recreation” and the Law: The Transformation of Popular Urban Leisure in Victorian England by Rachel Vorspan

1835 in British law
United Kingdom Acts of Parliament 1835
Repealed United Kingdom Acts of Parliament
Cruelty to animals
Animal welfare and rights legislation in the United Kingdom